Phulkian Misl was a Sikh misl named after Choudhary Phul Singh. Maharaja Ala Singh, Maharaja Amar Singh, Raja Sahib Singh, Raja Gajpat Singh, Maharaja Hamir Singh all are rulers of Phulkian misl (Bhadaur Barnala, Sangrur). The Sidhu-Brar Jats were the founders and rulers of this misl. The area of this misl is in region Patiala, Nabha, Jind. and existed until the British defeated them. The Phulkian misl was not a member of the Dal Khalsa having been excommunicated from the formation.

Gallery

See also
 Phulkian sardars
 Patiala State
 Nabha State
 Jind State
 Faridkot State
 Malaudh
 Bhadaur
 Kaithal
 Cis-Sutlej states

References

Social groups of Punjab, India
Jat princely states
Indian surnames
Misls